Frank W. Monroe  (1855 – July 2, 1908) was a Major League Baseball player, who played in two games for the 1884 Indianapolis Hoosiers. He played catcher in one game and outfielder in the other. He was hitless in eight at-bats in the two games. He played for the Chattanooga Lookouts in the Southern League in 1885.

External links
Baseball-Reference page

19th-century baseball players
Major League Baseball outfielders
Major League Baseball catchers
Baseball players from Ohio
Indianapolis Hoosiers (AA) players
Chattanooga Lookouts players
Hamilton (minor league baseball) players
1855 births
1908 deaths